Muzikizum is the debut studio album by X-Press 2. It was released on Skint Records in 2002. It features vocal contributions from David Byrne, Dieter Meier, and Steve Edwards. It peaked at number 15 on the UK Albums Chart.

Critical reception

At Metacritic, which assigns a weighted average score out of 100 to reviews from mainstream critics, the album received an average score of 75, based on 10 reviews, indicating "generally favorable reviews".

John Bush of AllMusic wrote, "Muzikizum is informed by a slim, spare aesthetic that sounds more 1992 than 2002, evoking simply produced, imperial-sounding tracks from Spooky and Leftfield; in other words, the glory days of progressive house." Gary Mulholland of The Guardian commented that "Brighton club veterans Rocky, Diesel and Ashley Beedle seamlessly blend slick-but-tough pop with your full-on Ibiza-friendly house instrumental."

Track listing

Personnel
Credits adapted from liner notes.

 X-Press 2 – arrangement, production, art direction, design
 David Byrne – vocals (on "Lazy")
 Dieter Meier – vocals (on "I Want You Back")
 Steve Edwards – vocals (on "Call That Love")
 Pete Z – keyboards (on "Lazy", "Call That Love", and "The Ending")
 James Brown – engineering, mixing
 Adam Wren – mixing (except "AC/DC" and "The Ending")
 Simon Thornton – editing (on "Supasong")
 Tom Hingston – art direction, design
 Hamish Brown – photography
 Jason Evans – photography

Charts

References

External links
 

2002 debut albums
X-Press 2 albums
Skint Records albums